The Ventura and Ojai Valley Railroad gave Ojai, California, a connection to the national rail network Pacific Coast Line at Ventura Junction. Ventura Junction was located at Southern Pacific Railroad milepost (MP) 397.3 a short distance west of Ventura station. The railway required grades as steep as three percent following the Ventura River upstream through Chrisman, Wadstrom, Ortonville, and then turning east through Mira Monte into Ojai. The line completed by Captain John Cross in 1898 became a branch of the Southern Pacific Railroad in 1899. The first passenger train reached Ojai (then called Nordhoff) on 12 March 1898. Trains leaving Ojai at 07:20 and 16:00 made passenger stops at Grant (near Rotary Community Park), Tico, Las Cross, and Weldons before turning around at Ventura to return to Ojai at 13:00 and 20:15. Southern Pacific operated only one daily passenger train during the summer months; and all passenger service ended in the early 1930s.

Sources of freight included the Ojai Olive Company olive oil extraction plant built near the Ojai depot in 1901, and the Ojai Orange Association citrus packing house built on the east side of Bryant Street about 1910. The packing house was handling from 15% to 20% of the Ventura County citrus production before World War II, and a Shell Oil refinery near the Ventura River shipped refined petroleum products from the Ventura Oil Field.

Demise 
A Pineapple Express beginning on 18 January 1969 caused the largest and most damaging recorded flood on the Ventura River watershed. Flood damage caused abandonment of the railway upstream of MP 402.68; however, freight service to the refinery at Canet continued until Southern Pacific filed for abandonment of the branch in 1995. The upstream portion of the rail line from Foster Park to Ojai, abandoned in 1969, became the Ojai Valley Trail completed in 1989; the remaining downstream portion of the line was later opened as the Ventura River Trail in October of 1999.

Locomotives

References

Defunct California railroads
Passenger rail transportation in California
Defunct public transport operators in the United States
Transportation companies based in California
History of Ventura County, California